Swartzentruber may refer to:

 Don Swartzentruber, an American artist
 Swartzentruber Amish, a subgroup of the Old Order Amish

See also
 Brandon Swartzendruber (*1985),  an American soccer player